Mohamed Fouad Shafiq, more commonly known by his stage name Fouad Shafiq or Fouad Shafik (1899-1964) was an Egyptian actor.

Early life
Shafiq was born "Mohamed Fouad Shafiq" on 13 October 1899, in Cairo, Egypt. His father was an Egyptian of Turkish origin whose family arrived in Egypt from Crete; his brother was the renowned actor Hussein Riad. After his father's death, Shafiq left his high school and moved to Sudan where he worked and also married.

Acting career
Upon returning to Egypt in 1924, Shafiq met Youssef Wahbi and began his career in acting through the film "Anthem of Hope". Thereafter, he also worked in many plays in the Fatima Rushdi Ensemble. His performances varied between comedy and tragedy.

Death
He died on 2 September 1964.

References

External links 
 

1899 births
1964 deaths
Egyptian people of Turkish descent
Egyptian male film actors
Male actors from Cairo